John Harle (born 20 September 1956) is an English saxophonist, composer, educator and record producer. He is an Ivor Novello Award winner and has been the recipient of two Royal Television Society awards.

Biography 
Harle was born in Newcastle upon Tyne. Following his education at the Royal College of Music in London and, as a French Government Music Scholar, in Paris with Daniel Deffayet, he won the Amcon Award of The American Concert Artists Guild. In his early years, he was a member of the band of composer Michael Nyman and orchestrator for film composer Stanley Myers, expanding from that into scoring for film and television. In the 1990s, he began a career as saxophonist and composer, both artistically and commercially.

He composed the theme tune and music for the BBC TV series Silent Witness and, in May 1998, was the castaway on BBC Radio 4's long-running Desert Island Discs programme, with the BBC describing him as "the most-recorded saxophonist in the world".

He was artistic advisor to Paul McCartney for six years, and has collaborated with Elvis Costello, Herbie Hancock and Elmer Bernstein.

In addition to his own prolific recording, Harle has contributed directly or indirectly to a number of charting songs and albums by others. A jingle he wrote for Nissan in 1993 became the basis of a charting pop single by Jazzie B. His  Terror and Magnificence (1996) featured Elvis Costello, Sarah Leonard and Andy Sheppard. He contributed to the charting album Standing Stone (1997) by Paul McCartney.

Harle has also been an educator, serving at the Guildhall School of Music and Drama in London in the late 1980s as a professor of Saxophone and Chamber Music. He is currently Professor of Saxophone at the Guildhall School.

In 2012, the Royal Television Society awarded Harle its "Music: Original Score" award for his composition for BBC 2's programme Lucian Freud: Painted Life, describing it as "An excellent, challenging and original score that perfectly complements Freud's powerful imagery". It also won the 2013 British Academy of Songwriters, Composers and Authors (BASCA) Ivor Novello Award for "Best Television Soundtrack".

In October 2013, on BBC Radio 3's In Tune programme,  Harle talked about his recently released album Art Music, the composition of which was inspired by his favourite paintings.

Harle appeared with Marc Almond on BBC Radio 4's Front Row in February 2014 to discuss their collaborative work about Gothic London, The Tyburn Tree (Dark London). Harle was a guest on the same programme in November of that year, to mark the bicentenary of the birth of Adolphe Sax by assessing the contribution of Sax's invention, the saxophone.

Harle has written a reference book, The Saxophone: The Art and Science of Playing and Performing, published in May 2017.

Personal life 
Harle has two sons, writer and curator Matthew Harle, and Mad Decent composer and producer Danny L Harle.

References

External links

John Harle's homepage at Chester Music

1956 births
Living people
21st-century saxophonists
21st-century British male musicians
Alumni of the Royal College of Music
British male saxophonists
Contemporary classical music performers
English composers
English classical saxophonists
Musicians from Newcastle upon Tyne
People educated at the Royal Grammar School, Newcastle upon Tyne